Jinbu (Odaesan) station is a railway station in Jinbu-myeon, Pyeongchang, South Korea. It is served by the Gangneung Line and is located near Odaesan National Park and the Pyeongchang Olympic Stadium. The station opened on 22 December 2017, ahead of the 2018 Winter Olympics, and is designed to accommodate 20-car trains deployed during the Olympics. The station cost 18.1 billion won (US$16.25 million) to construct over a 10-month period. During the Olympics, Jinbu station was served by shuttle buses that traveled to Olympic venues and other destinations.

References

External links

Buildings and structures in Pyeongchang County
Railway stations in Gangwon Province, South Korea
Railway stations opened in 2017